Mercyhurst North East was a two-year Catholic liberal arts college in North East, Pennsylvania.  It was a branch campus of Mercyhurst University. The college was established in 1991 when Mercyhurst College purchased the former home of the Redemptorist Fathers, a seminary built in 1868. Mercyhurst North East offers one-year certificates and two-year associate degrees in a variety of majors. The school campus closed at the end of the 2020–2021 term, consolidating all programs into the larger Mercyhurst campus in Erie.

As of the 2009–2010 academic year, the school enrolled more than 1,060 students, both resident and commuter. The school featured many athletic teams, including men's and women's basketball, wrestling, lacrosse, cross country, golf, soccer, swimming and diving, baseball and softball.

Athletics affiliations 
Mercyhurst North East competed in 16 National Junior College Athletic Association (NJCAA) sports. Teams were known as the "Saints". The Saints were a member of the Ohio Community College Athletic Conference (OCCAC).

NJCAA sports
Baseball
Men's and women's basketball
Men's & Women's Cross Country
Men's & Women's golf
Men's and women's lacrosse
Men's and women's soccer
Softball
Men's and women's swimming and diving
Women's volleyball
Wrestling (independent)

See also
Mercyhurst University

References

External links
Official website

Educational institutions established in 1991
Universities and colleges in Erie County, Pennsylvania
1991 establishments in Pennsylvania
Liberal arts colleges in Pennsylvania